The Ottomány culture, also known as Otomani culture in Romania or Otomani-Füzesabony culture in Hungary, was an early Bronze Age culture (ca. 2100–1400 BC) in Central Europe named after the eponymous site near the village of Ottomány, today part of Sălacea, located in modern-day Bihor County, Romania. The Middle Bronze Age period of the Ottomány culture in eastern Hungary and western Romania (c. 1750 BC to 1400 BC) is also known as the Gyulavarsánd culture.

Territorial extent

The Ottomány culture was located in eastern Hungary, eastern Slovakia, Crișana in western Romania,  western Ukraine - Transcarpatia (Zakarpattia Oblast - within a stretch of the Carpathian mountains) and southeast Poland (stretch of Carpathian mountains and nearby areas). Thus, people of the Ottomány culture secured a middle stretch of what will be later known as the Amber Road, and indeed, amber is often found in Ottomány sites.
The expansion of the Ottomány culture is associated with the end of the Hatvan culture.

Habitat, settlements, housing and material culture

People belonging to this vast culture settled along river banks and in valleys but also on strategic places like mountain passes and hills used for mighty fortified settlements. Some places like caves and natural springs were used like for cult activities. This culture was contemporary with Wietenberg culture in Romania, Unetice-Madarovce-Veterov-Boheimkirchen cultural complex in Moravia, Germany, Austria and western Slovakia, Mierzanowice culture in Poland and Makó/Nagyrév culture in Hungary. The high cultural level is illustrated most by fortified settlements with highly advanced defensive architecture including ditches, stone walls, ramparts, towers and complicated gates protected by bastions, as well as by urbanistically organized houses (1, 2 or three rooms), tell disposition at lowland sites (consequent use of houses made of clay, creating an artificial hill with many stratigraphic levels), the high level of metal working (bronze, gold, silver), a high level of bone and antler working (including elements of horse harness made of antler), sophisticated pottery, often considered one of the most exquisite ceramic cultures of prehistoric Europe, with beautifully adorned amphorae, jugs, broad bowls, small cups, pottery of milk processing, and piraunoi - transportable ceramic ovens, richly decorated, often interpreted as being used not only for profane, but also cult activities (burning incense). Some distinctive features of Ottomány ceramics are decoration with spiral or circular motifs, rich plastic ornamentation, use of a wave pattern or pattern of "running spirals", polishing of pottery to reach "metallic effect" and high firing temperatures. Metalworking is illustrated by gold jewelry, mainly earrings, small bronze objects (pins, personal ornaments, small tools - needles, awls), military items include battle axes, spear-heads, daggers, knives, and arrowheads. Although stone was still widely used for sickles and working axes.

According to Anthony (2007), chariotry spread westwards to the Ottomány culture from the Multi-cordoned ware culture.

Mortuary rite

Burials were typically inhumations with the body in a flexed position in large flat cemeteries in direct vicinity of settlements, with different sides for men and women, at the final stages shifting towards bi-ritual rites, with more cremations, using urns. Graves are equipped with rich grave goods, including personal adornments like beads (in male graves often made of animal teeth and boar tusks) and metal jewelry, tools, arms and ceramics. In a child grave at Nizna Mysla cemetery (Eastern Slovakia), a ceramic model of a four-wheel wagon was found and has been interpreted either as child's toy or a cult object.

Collapse and legacy
The end of the Ottomány culture is connected with turbulent events at the end of Old Bronze Age in Central Europe, where there was a collapse of the whole "Old Bronze Age world" with its highly advanced culture of mighty hill-forts, rich burials, and trade over vast distances. The gradual decline in the number of fortified settlements, change of burial rites, and the decision of people to desert fortified settlements could have had several reasons, including the collapse of trade and exchange networks, the attacks of enemies, the internal collapse of society or environmental causes. The following Middle Bronze Age/Late Bronze Age cultures are very different in their burial rites (cremation, erecting of barrows) as well as in their handling of bronze - there is an "explosion" in bronze working, and many bronze hoards found across all of Europe illustrate this change in quantity and quality of produced bronze objects. We see not only bronze ornaments and arms (including first examples of swords), but also bronze tools (sickles, axes, adzes), which changed the everyday life of prehistoric man.

Gallery

See also
 Bronze Age Europe
 Bronze Age in Romania
 Prehistory of Transylvania
 Bronze Age in Poland
 History of Slovakia - Bronze Age
Wietenberg culture
Vatya culture
Monteoru culture
Unetice culture
Bronze Age Britain
Argaric culture
Sintashta culture
Catacomb culture
Aegean civilization
 History of Hungary - Bronze Age

References

N. Boroffka, Die Wietenberg-Kultur. Ein Beitrag zur Erforschung der Bronzezeit in Südosteuropa. Universitätsforschungen zur Prähistorischen Archäologie 19. Dr. Rudolf Habelt GmbH (Bonn 1994).
http://arheologie.ulbsibiu.ro/publicatii/bibliotheca/cauce2/8%20w.htm This link is by pure laymen giving no scientific sources at all.
Bronze Age culture in Transylvania, Central Romania
Die prähistorische Ansiedlung auf dem "Wietenberg" bei Sighisoara-Schässburg [Gebundene Ausgabe]
European Societies in the Bronze Age. A. F. Harding. Cambridge 2000.

External links

 Bronze Age Hungary - Images and text
 The Bronze Age - Hungarian National Museum
 Hungarian archaeology at the turn of the Millennium
 The stone fortifications of the settlement at Spišský Štvrtok. A contribution to the discussion on the long-distance contacts of the Otomani-Füzesabony culture
 The Early Bronze Age Stone Fortifications of the Maszkowice Hillfort (Polish Carpathians)
 http://www.eliznik.org.uk/EastEurope/History/balkans-map/middle-bronze.htm#nogo
 https://web.archive.org/web/20110813042406/http://care.e-monsite.com/rubrique,car-z-carpato-danubiana,1050465.html
 http://www.regionkosice.com/en/index.php?id=629&tx_ttnews%5Btt_news%5D=83&tx_ttnews%5BbackPid%5D=621&no_cache=1

Archaeological cultures of Central Europe
Bronze Age cultures of Europe
Archaeological cultures in Hungary
Archaeological cultures in Romania
Archaeological cultures in Slovakia
Archaeological cultures in Ukraine
Prehistory of Southeastern Europe
Ancient history of Romania
History of Transylvania